The Ayémé Solar Power Station is a proposed 120 megawatts solar power plant in Gabon. The power station is under development by Solen, an independent power producer (IPP). The solar farm will be developed in two phases of 60 megawatts each. The energy generated at this power station is expected to be sold to the Energy and Water Company of Gabon (Société d’Energie et d’Eau du Gabon) (SEEG), for distribution in Libreville, the capital city of the county and its surrounding metropolis.

Location

Overview
As of March 2022, Gabon's installed electricity generation capacity was reported as 750 megawatts. Of this, about 50 percent is sourced from natural gas. The remaining portion is sourced from hydropower and fossil-fuel sources. The Government of Gabon has ambitions to source 80 percent of its grid supply from renewable energy sources by 2030.

The design to this solar farm calls for a generation capacity of 120 megawatts, when fully developed. The power station will be developed in two phases of 60 megawatts each. The power is primarily for use in Libreville, where 250 megawatts of new generation are needed by 2023, in order to comply with previous environmental emissions commitments.

Developers
The company that owns and is developing this power station, is called Solen. Solen specializes in building solar power stations in Africa. The company is based in France. In addition, Solen is expected to train the staff of SEEG, the Gabonese electric utility parastatal, in the operation and maintenance of solar power stations.

See also

 List of power stations in Gabon
 Oyem Solar Power Station

References

Estuaire Province
Power stations in Gabon
Solar power stations in Gabon
Proposed solar power stations in Gabon